Białaczów  is a village (a town in 1456 - 1870) in Opoczno County, Łódź Voivodeship, in central Poland. It is the seat of the gmina (administrative district) called Gmina Białaczów. The village has a population of 1,500. Historically, Białaczów belongs to Lesser Poland, and together with Opoczno, for hundreds of years it belonged to Lesser Poland’s Sandomierz Voivodeship. The village is the birthplace of Jan Prandota, the Bishop of Kraków (1242-1266).

History 
In the 13th century, Białaczów belonged to the Odrowąż family. The village received its town charter in 1456. At that time, it was part of Opoczno County of Sandomierz Voivodeship, and remained part of it until the Partitions of Poland. Białaczów was a private town, changing hands several times. In the late 18th and early 19th century it belonged to Stanisław Małachowski, who in neighboring villages opened several early industry factories. In 1795 Białaczów found itself in the Austrian Empire, and later on, it became part of the Duchy of Warsaw (since 1815: Russian-controlled Congress Kingdom). Its coat of arms was devised by Stanisław Małachowski in 1787, and in 1870, like many other towns of northern Lesser Poland, Białaczów was reduced to the status of a village, as a punishment for residents’ patriotic support of the anti-Russian January Uprising.

Points of interest 
 parish church. First church in Białaczów was built in the 13th century. It burned in 1511, and was rebuilt soon afterwards. The church was remodeled in 1694-1696, 1870 and 1932,
 classicistic town hall (1797),
 classicistic palace complex with a park, built in 1797-1800 by Stanisław Małachowski, renovated in the 1980s,
 early 19th century inn,
 18th and 19th century houses in the market square.

References

Villages in Opoczno County
Lesser Poland
Sandomierz Voivodeship
Radom Governorate
Kielce Voivodeship (1919–1939)
Łódź Voivodeship (1919–1939)